Prashant Raj (born 10 March 1982 in Bangalore) is an Indian film director and screenwriter known for his work in Kannada cinema. He made his directorial debut with Love Guru in 2009.

Career
Prashant Raj is an Indian film director who's been entertaining the audience with his movies for a decade now. It was in the year 2009 he made his debut directional movie Love Guru and set up his benchmark in the Kannada Film Industry. Later Raj continued his direction journey by directing various hit movies like Ghana Bhajana, Whistle, Zoom, Dalapathi, and Orange.

Filmography

Awards and nominations

External links
 Love Guru review Retrieved 26 February 2011.

1982 births
Living people
Kannada film directors
Screenwriters from Bangalore
Film directors from Bangalore
21st-century Indian film directors